The Field Maple Acer campestre cultivar 'Commodore' is of obscure origin.

Description
'Commodore' is a medium-size tree with clear yellow foliage, occasionally flushed red, in autumn.

Cultivation
As with the species, the cultivar thrives best in a semi shade position, on a fertile, well-drained soil.

Accessions
None known.

References

Field maple cultivars